Multitude SE (until June 2021 The Ferratum Group) is a fully regulated growth platform for financial technology. Its ambition is to become the most valued financial ecosystem. This vision is backed by +17 years of solid track record in building and scaling financial technology. Through its full European banking license, profound know-how in technology, regulation, cross-selling, and funding, Multitude enables a range of sustainable banking and financial services to grow and scale. Currently, it has three independent business units on this growth platform: Ferratum as consumer lender, CapitalBox as business lender, and SweepBank as shopping and financing app. Multitude and its independent units employ over 700 people in 19 countries, and they together generated EUR 213 million turnover in 2021. Multitude was founded in 2005 in Finland and is listed in the Prime Standard segment of the Frankfurt Stock Exchange under the symbol.

History and founder
Multitude was founded in 2005 by Jorma Jokela, who has been its CEO since formation. He is the founder of Jokela Capital Oy in Helsinki where he headed the company as CEO from 1998 to 2000. He subsequently sold the Jokela Capital business in 2004.

Geographical presence and operation
Multitude provides mobile loans to consumers and small businesses and is currently represented in Europe, North America, South America, and the APAC region. The company has an EU banking license.

Listing on the Frankfurt Stock Exchange
Multitude was listed on the Frankfurt Stock Exchange Main List on February 6, 2015. Ferratum was the first FinTech company in the stock exchange. In the announcement, Ferratum sold its shares to international institutional investors. The sale price of the shares was EUR 17, with the company's market value of approximately EUR 370 million. A total of EUR 48 million was collected for the purpose of financing the company's future growth: new product areas and business expansion. After the listing, Jorma Jokela is still the largest shareholder in the company.

Launch of SweepBank
SweepBank launched to the public in 2016 in Germany, Sweden and Norway. Users can access their current accounts, savings, and debit cards in multiple currencies in one app.
The open architecture of the mobile banking app allows for the integration of service widgets published by other companies.
The mobile banking app uses behavioral data analysis to recommend new services to users.

Commerce Commission Court Case
In June 2020, Multitude agreed to settle a claim over alleged breaches of the lender responsibility principles in New Zealand, whereby 46 named customers received $88,173 costs repaid.

References

External links
 Multitude

Financial services companies of Finland
Companies based in Helsinki
Financial services companies established in 2005
2005 establishments in Finland
Finnish brands